Global public good, in economics, a public good available worldwide
 GNU Privacy Guard, cryptography software
 Goals against average (GAA), also known as goals per game, sports statistic
 Grains per gallon, water hardness measurement
 The Good Pub Guide, recommends pubs in the UK
 Generalized Petersen graph, a type of mathematical graph

Companies
 Guinness Peat Group, an investment holding company
 Grammophon-Philips Group, a previous name for record company PolyGram
 Greenwood Publishing Group, an educational and academic publisher in the USA
 Gas Powered Games, and their GPGNet online matchmaking service